František Čermák and Leoš Friedl were the defending champions, but none competed this year.

Mariusz Fyrstenberg and Marcin Matkowski won the title by defeating Lucas Arnold Ker and Sebastián Prieto 7–6(9–7), 6–4 in the final.

Seeds

Draw

Draw

References

External links
 Official results archive (ATP)
 Official results archive (ITF)

Orange Warsaw Open
2005 ATP Tour